Stilesia is a genus of flatworms belonging to the family Anoplocephalidae.

Species:

Stilesia alii 
Stilesia ambajogaensis 
Stilesia aurangabadensis 
Stilesia aurangabadensis 
Stilesia caprai 
Stilesia daulatabadensis 
Stilesia dhondagae 
Stilesia garhwalensis 
Stilesia globipunctata 
Stilesia govindi 
Stilesia indica 
Stilesia jadhave 
Stilesia kaijensis 
Stilesia kotdwarensis 
Stilesia marathwadaensis 
Stilesia mehdii 
Stilesia thapari 
Stilesia yavalensis

References

Platyhelminthes